A teacher's pet is a person that has an advantageous position compared to other students, where the teacher views the student extremely positively. It can be viewed unsympathetically by other students due to jealousy or envy in certain situations. The phenomenon is extensively acknowledged by the public, but actual research on the topic is very limited. "Teacher's pets" are usually the smartest and academically talented individuals within a classroom or a cohort. They often display signs of holding high amounts of knowledge within certain areas of interest. Being called a "teacher's pet" can be perceived either positively or negatively based on specific preferences.

References

Types of students